The 1897 Wellington City mayoral election was part of the New Zealand local elections held that same year. The polling was conducted using the standard first-past-the-post electoral method.

Background
In 1897 incumbent Mayor Francis Bell retired leading to the chairman of the Wellington Education Board John Rutherford Blair being elected to office as the new Mayor of Wellington, beating challenges from MP George Fisher (a former mayor).

Results
The following table gives the election results:

Notes

References

Mayoral elections in Wellington
1897 elections in New Zealand
Politics of the Wellington Region
1890s in Wellington